Super Hits is an album by American country music singer George Jones, released in 1987 on the Epic Records label. It was certified platinum by the RIAA in 1992, and double platinum in 2002. It has sold 2,289,000 copies in the US as of May 2013.

This is the first of Sony Music's long-running Super Hits series of budget-priced compilations.

Track listing

Chart performance

Year-end charts

Certifications

References

External links
George Jones' Official Website
Record Label

1987 greatest hits albums
George Jones compilation albums
Epic Records compilation albums
Albums produced by Billy Sherrill